Lee Dong-keun (Hangul: 이동근;  or  ; born 20 November 1990) is a Korean badminton player specializing in men's singles. He won his first international senior title at the 2011 Vietnam International tournament. Lee participated at the 2012 World University Championships in Gwangju, South Korea, won a gold medal in the mixed team and a bronze in the singles events. He was also part of the South Korean winning team at the 2014 Asian Games. In 2016, Lee represented his country competing at the Summer Olympics in Rio de Janeiro, Brazil.

Achievements

World University Championships 
Men's singles

BWF World Junior Championships 
Boys' singles

BWF World Tour 
The BWF World Tour, which was announced on 19 March 2017 and implemented in 2018, is a series of elite badminton tournaments sanctioned by the Badminton World Federation (BWF). The BWF World Tour is divided into levels of World Tour Finals, Super 1000, Super 750, Super 500, Super 300 (part of the HSBC World Tour), and the BWF Tour Super 100.

Men's singles

BWF Grand Prix 
The BWF Grand Prix had two levels, the Grand Prix and Grand Prix Gold. It was a series of badminton tournaments sanctioned by the Badminton World Federation (BWF) and played between 2007 and 2017.

Men's singles

  BWF Grand Prix Gold tournament
  BWF Grand Prix tournament

BWF International Challenge/Series 
Men's singles

  BWF International Challenge tournament
  BWF International Series tournament

References

External links 
 
 
 

1990 births
Living people
Badminton players from Seoul
South Korean male badminton players
Badminton players at the 2016 Summer Olympics
Olympic badminton players of South Korea
Badminton players at the 2014 Asian Games
Badminton players at the 2018 Asian Games
Asian Games gold medalists for South Korea
Asian Games medalists in badminton
Medalists at the 2014 Asian Games